Mount Pleasant is an unincorporated community located largely in St. George's Hundred, New Castle County, Delaware, United States. Mount Pleasant is located at the intersection of Delaware routes 71 and 896, north of Middletown.  The A. Eliason House, north of town, is listed on the National Register of Historic Places.

References

External links

Unincorporated communities in New Castle County, Delaware
Unincorporated communities in Delaware